Sgurr na Feartaig (863 m) is a mountain in the Northwest Highlands, Scotland. It is located northeast of Strathcarron in Wester Ross.

The mountain takes the form of a long ridge that dominates much of the southern side of Glen Carron. A stalker's path runs along the summit ridge.

References

Mountains and hills of the Northwest Highlands
Marilyns of Scotland
Corbetts